Drastic Measures is a 1983 album by the rock band Kansas.

Drastic Measures may also refer to:
Drastic Measures (Bayonne album) (2019)
Drastic Measures (Dalbello album) (1981)